Exoribonuclease II (ribonuclease II, ribonuclease Q, BN ribonuclease, Escherichia coli exo-RNase II, RNase II, exoribonuclease (misleading), 5'-exoribonuclease) is an enzyme. This enzyme catalyses the following chemical reaction

 Exonucleolytic cleavage in the 3'- to 5'-direction to yield nucleoside 5'-phosphates

This enzyme has preference for single-stranded RNA.

See also 
 5'-3' exoribonuclease 2

References

External links 
 

EC 3.1.13